Rumex obtusifolius, commonly known as bitter dock, broad-leaved dock, bluntleaf dock, dock leaf, dockens or butter dock, is a perennial plant in the family Polygonaceae. It is native to Europe, but is found on all temperate continents. It is a highly invasive species in some zones, resulting from its abundant seed dispersal, adaptability to reproduce, aggressive roots, ability to tolerate extreme climates, and hardiness.

Etymology
The name, Rumex obtusifolius, was assigned by Carl Linnaeus in the 18th century, and has remained unchanged, although there are numerous subspecies. Rumex was Pliny's name for sorrel, while obtusifolius means 'obtuse-leaved' (obtuse + foliage).

Description
It is easily recognizable by its very large oval leaves with cordate bases and rounded tips, some of the lower leaves having red stems. The edges of the leaves are slightly "crisped" or wavy, the upper surface is hairless and the under surface may be papillose.

The junctions of the petioles with the stems are covered by a sheath formed by two fused stipules known as an ocrea, a thin, paper-like membrane – a characteristic of the family Polygonaceae. The stem leaves are alternate and are narrowly ovate–lanceolate. The inflorescence consists of large clusters of racemes which contain small greenish flowers that change to red as they mature. The perianth-segments are in two whorls of three. Segments in the outer whorl are small and spreading while the inner whorl forms fruit valves, which are widely ovately-triangular. The seeds produced are dry and reddish brown. This plant blooms June through September.

Rumex crispus – curly dock – is similar in appearance, but with thinner and wave-like leaves. In more detail, the calyx of curly dock has smooth margins while the calyx of broad-leaved dock has horned margins.

Distribution and habitat
Rumex obtusifolius is widely distributed throughout the world. It is a plant growing readily on arable land, meadows, waste ground, roadsides, ditches, shorelines, riverbanks, woodland margins, forest clearings, and orchards. Seedlings can be identified by the oval leaves with red stems and rolled leaves sprouting from the center of the plant. Regrowth from the rosette usually takes place in spring.

Uses

Leaves of the plant can be used as salad, to prepare a vegetable broth or to be cooked like spinach. They contain oxalic acid which can be hazardous if consumed in large quantities. Dried seeds are used as a spice. In Romania and Greece the leaves are sometimes used as an alternative to other plants in the making of sarmale. A tea prepared from the root was thought to cure boils.

In Ireland and the United Kingdom, the plant is often found growing near stinging nettles and if stung, the dock leaf, squeezed to extract a little juice, can be rubbed on the skin to counteract the itching caused by brushing against a nettle plant.

History

In George Eliot's Adam Bede, set in the early 19th century, broad dock leaves were used to wrap farmhouse butter.

Host plant
Rumex obtusifolius is a major host plant for many different insects as well, including the Acronicta rumicis moth. For A. rumicis research, this host plant is generally targeted because it is found highly within the moth's range.

Invasiveness and eradication

Rumex obtusifolius is an aggressive invasive species on all temperate continents. Broad-leaved dock is designated an "injurious weed" under the UK Weeds Act 1959. It has been an invasive species of the Great Lakes region of North America where it was first sighted in 1840.

Various parasites and predators of R. obtusifolius include 32 insect species and 12 fungi species. In the UK, the invertebrate herbivore species is a leaf beetle, Gastrophysa viridula.

References

External links

 
 
 

obtusifolius
Flora of Europe
Plants described in 1753
Taxa named by Carl Linnaeus